The Huulien ground skink (Scincella apraefrontalis)  is a species of skink found in Vietnam.

References

Scincella
Reptiles described in 2010
Taxa named by Wolfgang Böhme (herpetologist)
Taxa named by Thomas Ziegler (zoologist)